Efrem Marianus Almeida Santos Jeronimo (born 10 June 1994) is an East Timorese former footballer who is last known to have played as a attacker for Jeonju Citizen FC.

Career

Club career

Before the 2014 season, Marianus Almeida Santos Jeronimo signed for South Korean fourth tier side Jeonju Citizen FC after starring in film A Barefoot Dream, where he suffered injuries.

International career

At the age of 16, he debuted for Timor-Leste.

References

External links

 

East Timorese footballers
Living people
East Timorese expatriate footballers
Association football forwards
1994 births
Expatriate footballers in South Korea
Timor-Leste international footballers